Abraham Nimham (1745-1778), son of warrior and emissary Daniel Nimham, was a leader of the Wappinger tribe. During the Revolutionary War he served with his father in the Stockbridge Militia, often accompanying Daniel Nimham on diplomatic and recruiting missions.

Abraham was commissioned a captain, and was given command of a detachment of sixty Stockbridge and River Indian soldiers. On April 28th, 1778, Abraham and his father joined the Continental Army at White Plains, NY. 

On August 31, 1778, both Abraham and Daniel Nimham were ambushed and killed by a ranger patrol under the command of John Graves Simcoe during the Battle of Kingsbridge at Cortlandt Ridge.

References

Wappinger people
Native Americans in the American Revolution
Native American leaders
1745 births
1778 deaths
United States military personnel killed in the American Revolutionary War